Shake may refer to:
 Handshake
 Milkshake
 Tremor
 Shakes (wood), cracks in timber
 Shake (shingle), a wooden shingle made from split logs

Shake, The Shakes, Shaking, or Shakin' may refer to:

Geography
 Shake, Zimbabwe
 Shake, another name for Sake language, used in parts of Gabon

People
 Shakin' Stevens, Welsh rock and roll singer
 Anthony "Shake" Shakir, Detroit techno producer
 Master Shake, a character in Aqua Teen Hunger Force
 Shake (singer) (Sheikh Abdullah Ahmad), Malaysian singer
 Shaking, a stage name of Xie Keyin, Chinese singer, rapper and songwriter
Malik "Shake" Milton, American basketball player

Music
 Shake (music) (more commonly known as a trill), a musical ornament
 The Shake (dance), a fad dance of the 1960s
 The Shake (American rock band)

Albums
 Shake (The Thing album) (2015)
 Shake (John Schlitt album) (1995)
 Shake! (album) (1968), by the Siegel–Schwall Band
 Shake (2001), by Zucchero Fornaciari
 [[Shakin' (album)|Shakin''' (album)]], 1986 work by country music group Sawyer Brown
The Shake (Laurie Johnson), an LP by Laurie Johnson, the base of what is now known as "The Avengers Theme"

Songs
 "Shake" (Sam Cooke song) (1964), notably covered by Otis Redding
 "Shake!" (The Time song) (1990)
 "Shake" (EliZe song) (2004)
 "Shake" (Ying Yang Twins song) (2005)
 "Shake" (Jesse McCartney song) (2010)
 "Shake" (Little Boots song) (2011)
 "Shake" (Flavour N'abania song) (2012)
 "Shake" (CNBLUE song) (2017)
 "Shake" (1981), by GQ
 "Shake" (1993), from the album Concentration by Machines of Loving Grace
 "Shake" (1999), by Double
 "Shake" (2009), from The Alesha Show: The Encore by Alesha Dixon 
 "Shake" (2013), by Victoria Justice
 "Shake" (2013), from Let's Be Still by The Head and the Heart
 Shakin' (Eddie Money song)
 Shakin' (Sawyer Brown song)
 "Shakin'", a song on the 2000 album Thirteen Tales from Urban Bohemia'' by The Dandy Warhols
 "The Shake" (Kisschasy song)
 "The Shake" (Neal McCoy song)

Other
 Camera shake, an effect fixed with image stabilization
 Shake (company), a legal document startup
 Shake (software), an image-compositing package produced by Apple Inc
 Shake (unit), an informal unit of time equal to ten nanoseconds
 SHAKE algorithm, a time integration algorithm for molecular dynamics simulation

See also
 Earthquake
 The Shake (disambiguation)
 Shake It (disambiguation)
 Shaked (surname)
 Shaken (disambiguation)
 Shaker (disambiguation)
 Shakes (disambiguation)
 Shock (disambiguation)
 Shook (disambiguation)